The 1994 German Open was a men's tennis tournament played on outdoor clay courts. It was the 88th edition of the Hamburg Masters and was part of the ATP Championship Series, Single Week category of the 1994 ATP Tour. It took place at the Rothenbaum Tennis Center in Hamburg, Germany, from 2 May through 9 May 1994.

Finals

Singles

 Andrei Medvedev defeated  Yevgeny Kafelnikov, 6–4, 6–4, 3–6, 6–3
 It was Medvedev's 2nd singles title of the year, and his 8th overall.

Doubles

 Scott Melville /  Piet Norval defeated  Henrik Holm /  Anders Järryd, 7–6, 6–3

References

External links
   
 ATP tournament profile